Haakon VII Land is a land area at the northwestern part of Spitsbergen, Svalbard, between Woodfjorden and Kongsfjorden. 

The area is named after Haakon VII of Norway.

The highest mountain in Haakon VII Land is Eidsvollfjellet.

References

Geography of Svalbard
Spitsbergen